Robert Malecki (known as Bob Malecki, born October 27, 1942) is an American activist living in Robertsfors, Sweden.

Malecki supported the Spartacist League (Sweden). He wrote an autobiography entitled Ha Ha Ha McNamara, Vietnam — My Bellybutton is my Crystalball! in reference to Robert McNamara, United States Secretary of Defense during most of the Vietnam War, and his comments critical of the war in the 1990s, which Malecki saw as hypocritical. A chapter from Ha Ha Ha McNamara was included in the 2007 book Against the Vietnam War: Writings by Activists.

Life and activities 
Malecki was born in Jersey City, New Jersey to a working-class family. At the age of 17 Malecki joined the Navy doing various jobs before being stationed at the Guantanamo Bay Naval Base. The Cuban Revolution and the subsequent Cuban Missile Crisis radicalized a few of Malecki's friends, who supported Fidel Castro, the new Cuban leader. After taking a thirty days leave (soon sixty, qualifying for AWOL status) over concerns made after agreeing to a six-year re-enlistment, Malecki attempted to gain a discharge by being intentionally caught carrying and taking drugs. After court-martial, he was then sent to a stockade in North Carolina where his plan caused him to be transferred to the Charleston Naval Hospital. After fourth months he was let out and went back to Staten Island. After this period, Malecki moved to Mexico but then moved to Cleveland, Ohio soon after.

In the summer of 1968, Malecki, who was now married, began work for General Motors. He received a leaflet one day while at a plant gate showing a napalm victim in North Vietnam. The leaflet stated that Dow Chemicals had produced the napalm and that it was being used in these situations. Malecki soon became involved in both the anti-Vietnam War movement and Trotskyist movement. From 1968 until 1972, Malecki took part in destroying "tens of thousands, perhaps hundreds of thousands, of draft files and orders... I [Malecki] also took responsibility for the destruction of the international computer network of the Dow Chemical Corp. in Washington DC." Malecki served time in prison for these acts and shortly after his release from prison was charged with conspiracy to bomb public buildings and power plants. With funds from other anti-war protesters, Malecki fled in exile to Sweden, where he remains to this day.

Malecki formerly worked with Straight Facts Radio. In 1998, he debated then-Prime Minister of Sweden Göran Persson on national radio.

References

External links 
 Website

1942 births
American anti–Vietnam War activists
American activists
American communists
Swedish communists
Swedish activists
American Trotskyists
American exiles
Living people